SCOTUSblog is a law blog written by lawyers, law professors, and law students about the Supreme Court of the United States (sometimes abbreviated "SCOTUS"). Formerly sponsored by Bloomberg Law, the site tracks cases before the Court from the certiorari stage through the merits stage. The site live blogs as the Court announces opinions and grants cases, and sometimes has information on the Court's actions published before either the Court or any other news source does. SCOTUSblog frequently hosts symposiums with leading experts on the cases before the Court. The blog comprehensively covers all of the cases argued before the Court and maintains an archive of the briefing and other documents in each case.

History and growth
The blog's first post was published on October 1, 2002. The blog began as a means of promoting the law firm then known as Goldstein & Howe, P.C. The blog moved to its current address on February 7, 2005. In the same year, it was featured by BusinessWeek in their weekly blog recommendation. A companion wiki was added in 2007, but its features were subsequently integrated into the blog itself.

In June 2007 the site announced that it was about to experience its single largest daily readership at 100,000 page views per day. The increase in traffic coincided with the Supreme Court's reversal of course on June 29, 2007, when it unexpectedly announced it would hear the Guantanamo Bay detainees’ challenges to the Military Commissions Act of 2006. A 2008 article in the New York Law School Law Review estimated that "before the end of the afternoon, SCOTUSblog alone had posted more information about the case than most newspapers provided even the next day." After Lyle Denniston stepped down as the blog's reporter at the Court in 2016, Amy Howe was named the blog's reporter.

Reception
A 2008 article in the New York Law School Law Review gave SCOTUSblog as an example of a successful law blog, together with Balkinization and the Volokh Conspiracy, and noted that "with growing numbers of lawyers and legal scholars commenting on breaking legal issues, the blogosphere provides more sophisticated, in-depth analysis of the law than is possible even in a long-form magazine article." Edward Adams, editor and publisher of the American Bar Association's ABA Journal, said that SCOTUSblog is one of the best law blogs. "It's run by lawyers and they cover the Supreme Court more intensively than any news organization does, and it does a better job, too."

The site is also known for its comprehensive coverage of the nomination and confirmation process for new justices. In 2009 Paul Krugman of The New York Times wrote of the site's coverage of the Sonia Sotomayor nomination, "Without SCOTUS[blog], the whole debate might have been about wise Latina women and Newt [Gingrich]’s Tweets from Auschwitz. Instead, we have some real information getting into the picture."

During the week of the Affordable Care Act hearings at the Supreme Court in March 2012, the site had one million hits owing to its extensive coverage of the arguments in both legalese and "In Plain English". Technorati rated the site as one of the 100 most influential blogs. The site is consistently on Technorati list of top politics blogs.

Awards
In 2010, SCOTUSblog was the recipient of the ABA's Silver Gavel award. It is the only blog to receive the award. In 2013, SCOTUSblog received the Peabody Award for excellence in electronic media. It is the first blog to ever receive the Peabody. It also won the 2012 Society of Professional Journalists (Sigma Delta Chi) prize for deadline reporting by an independent (non-affiliated) source for its coverage of the announcement of the Supreme Court's Affordable Care Act decision.

New media 
SCOTUSblog has a Tiktok account with over 240K followers. Katie Barlow posts regular updates there on court news and facts.

References

External links
 

American political blogs
Supreme Court of the United States
American legal websites
Internet properties established in 2002
2002 establishments in the United States
Peabody Award winners